Gabrielle Creevy is a Welsh actress, known for the leading role of Bethan Gwyndaf in the BBC series In My Skin. For her performance in the role, she won a BAFTA Cymru award.

Early life and career
Creevy is from Port Talbot and lived in a council flat as a child. Her mother is a mobile hairdresser in Port Talbot. She holds a BA in Acting from Arts Educational Schools.

She made her acting debut in three episodes of the S4C drama series Gwaith/Cartref in 2011. The next year, she appeared in an episode of the BBC medical drama Casualty. While attending the Arts Educational School in London, Creevy appeared in the ITV comedy series The Stand Up Sketch Show. In 2018, she filmed the pilot of In My Skin across five days for BBC Three. After it was commissioned into a full series, she was nominated for the BAFTA Cymru award for Actress in 2019. Creevy was working in the coffee shop of a gym when she learned that she had been nominated, and had to return to her shift after finding out. She then starred in a production titled Lose Yourself at the Sherman Theatre in Cardiff. Creevy's performance was described as "excellent" by The Guardian, and Debbie Johnson of An Organised Mess wrote that Creevy was "a joy in using language and compelling monologues which not only stimulated the imagination through words, tone and pace but in creating the challenge to accepted behaviours". Later in 2019, Creevy starred in the Channel 5 drama series 15 Days as Katie, and featured in another episode of Casualty. In 2020, she appeared in an episode of the BBC detective series Father Brown, which she enjoyed since it was her first period role. She is also set to appear in the Netflix film Operation Mincemeat. 

In 2021, it was announced that Creevy had been cast in the Showtime series Three Women. In My Skin returned for a second series in November 2021, with Creevy reprising her role as Bethan Gwyndaf.

Filmography

Awards and nominations

References

External links
 

21st-century Welsh actresses
BAFTA winners (people)
Living people
People educated at the Arts Educational Schools
People from Port Talbot
Welsh film actresses
Welsh stage actresses
Welsh television actresses
Year of birth missing (living people)